Ghanshyam Das Birla (10 April 1894 – 11 June 1983) was an Indian businessman and member of the Birla Family.

Birla family history
Ghanshyam Das Birla was born on 10 April 1894 at Pilani town in Jhunjhunu district, in the region known as Rajputana, as a member of the Marwari Maheshwari community.  His father was Raja Baldevdas Birla. In 1884 A.D. Baldeo Das Birla went to Bombay in search of new avenues of trade. He established his firm Shiv Narian Baldeo Das in Bombay in 1884 and Baldeo Das Jugal Kishore in 1897 in Calcutta. The firms started business in silver, cotton, grain and other commodities. He was succeeded by 4 sons, Jugal Kishore, Rameshwar Das, Ghanshyam Das and Braj Mohan. Ghanshyam Das was the most successful of the four brothers.

Business of Birla family
GD Birla inherited the family business and moved to further diversify them into other areas. Of these, at least three contemporary family business groups existing in India today can trace their ancestry to him. Of these businesses, he wanted to turn the moneylending business into manufacturing. So he left for Calcutta in Bengal Presidency, the world's largest jute producing region. There, he began "[i]ndependently as a jute broker". In 1918, he established Birla Jute Mills, much to the consternation of established European merchants, whom the biased policies of the British government favoured other than the local Bengali merchants. He had to scale a number of obstacles as the British and Scottish merchants tried to shut his business by unethical and monopolistic methods, but he was able to persevere. When World War I resulted in supply problems throughout the British Empire, Birla's business skyrocketed.

With an investment of 5 million   in 1919, the Birla Brothers Limited was formed. A mill was set up in Gwalior in the same year.

In 1926, he was elected to the Central Legislative Assembly of British India. He became the founding president of Harijan Sevak Sangh founded by Mahatma Gandhi in Delhi in 1932 .

In the 1940s, he ventured into the territory of cars and established Hindustan Motors. After independence, Birla invested in tea and textiles through a series of acquisitions of erstwhile European companies. He also expanded and diversified into cement, chemicals, rayon and steel tubes. Ghanshyam Das Birla during the Quit India Movement of 1942, had conceived the idea of organising a commercial bank with Indian capital and management, and the United Commercial Bank Limited was incorporated to give shape to that idea. UCO Bank, formerly United Commercial Bank, established in 1943 in Kolkata, is one of the oldest and major commercial bank of India.

Philanthropy

Envisioning infrastructural development in his hometown, Birla founded the Birla Engineering College (rechristened as Birla Institute of Technology and Science in 1964) in Pilani and the Technological Institute of Textile & Sciences in Bhiwani among other educational institutions in 1943. Both colleges have evolved over the years to develop into one of India's best engineering schools. Now Pilani also houses Birla Public School, a famous residential public school named after Birla's family and a number of polytechnic colleges. The town of Pilani and the local population enjoy a highly symbiotic relationship with these institutions, thereby stepping towards realising Birla's dream. TIT&S also evolved as the Center of Excellence in Textile based education and training. Moreover, G.D. Birla Memorial School, Ranikhet, a premier residential school has also been established in his honour by his son B.K. Birla and is today one of the best residential schools in the country and The Birla School in Kalyan, India was founded by his efforts with the collaboration of Kalyan Citizens' Education Society (KCES).

In 1957, he was awarded India's second-highest civilian honour, the Padma Vibhushan by the Government of India.

Ghanshyam Das Birla died in London on 11 June 1983 at the age of 89. There is a memorial to him in Golders Green Crematorium, Hoop Lane, London. It comprises a large statue overlooking the gardens with an inscription.

Relationship with Mahatma Gandhi 
Birla was a close associate and a steady supporter of Mahatma Gandhi, whom he met for the first time in 1916. Gandhi stayed at Birla's home in New Delhi during the last four months of his life.

Legacy
G. D. Birla had remarried after the death of his first wife. He had three sons, Lakshmi Nivas (son of his first wife Durga Devi), Krishna Kumar and Basant Kumar, (both sons of his second wife Mahadevi Birla). Kumar Mangalam Birla is his great grandson. Lakshmi Nivas was technically adapted by his older brother Jugal Kishor.

Writings by Ghanshyam Das Birla
His writings are mainly collections of memoirs, letters, essays and lectures.
 डायरी के कुछ पन्ने (Diary Ke Kuch Panne or Some pages of diary), 1940
 रुपए की कहानी (Rupaye Ki Kahani or Story of Rupee), 1948
 बापू (Bapu), 1941
 कुछ देखा कुछ सुना (Kuch Dekha Kuch Suna or Saw Something Heard Something), 1966
 जमनालाल बजाज (Jamnalal Bajaj)
 ध्रुवोपाख्यान, 1960
 रूप और स्वरूप : चार विचार-प्रेरक निबंध, 1960
 Paths to Prosperity, 1950
 In the Shadow of the Mahatma: a personal memoir  (Calcutta, 1953)

Further reading
Jajni, R. N., G. D. Birla (New Delhi, 1985)
Ross, A., The Emissary: G. D. Birla, Gandhi and Independence (1986)

See also
Basant Kumar Birla, his son
Birla Family
Birla Vidya Mandir
G.D.Birla Centre For Education
G D Birla Memorial School
Birla Education Trust
Birla Senior Secondary School 
Birla Public School
Birla Balika Vidyapeeth
Birla Shishu Vihar

References

External links

 Rs 2.80 Billion BITS Pilani Hyderabad Campus Foundation Laid
AP CM Readies BITS Pilani Hyderabad Campus
Milestone for BITS Pilani Hyderabad
Chief Minister AP Lays the BITS Pilani Hyderabad Campus Foundation
BITS Pilani Makes the Right Move at the Right Time
People who shaped India
In the Shadow of the Mahatma by Ghanshyam Das Birla

1894 births
1983 deaths
Rajasthani people
Recipients of the Padma Vibhushan in trade & industry
G.D.
Founders of Indian schools and colleges
Members of the Central Legislative Assembly of India
Indian philanthropists
Businesspeople from Rajasthan
Businesspeople from Kolkata
Businesspeople from Delhi
People from Jhunjhunu district
Indian independence activists from Rajasthan
Gandhians
Indian businesspeople in textiles
Indian businesspeople in cement
Indian bankers
Indian industrialists
Hindi-language writers
English-language writers from India
Indian founders of automobile manufacturers